This is a list of electoral results for the electoral district of Nunawading in Victorian state elections.

Members for Nunawading

Election results

Elections in the 1940s 

|- style="background-color:#E9E9E9"
! colspan="6" style="text-align:left;" |After distribution of preferences

 Preferences were not fully distributed.

Elections in the 1930s

Elections in the 1920s

References

Victoria (Australia) state electoral results by district